Johan Foltmar   (1714 – 26 April 1794) was a Danish composer.

See also
List of Danish composers

References
Dansk biografisk Lexikon 1905 to 1979
 Article in DMT by Erling Winkel 1942 Section 1 (Danish)
 Article in DMT by Erling Winkel 1942 section 2 (Danish)
This article was initially translated from the Danish Wikipedia.

Danish composers
Male composers
Foltmar family
1714 births
1794 deaths
18th-century composers
18th-century male musicians
18th-century musicians